The Battonya gas field is a natural gas field located in Battonya, Békés County. It was discovered in 1962 and developed by and MOL Group. It began production in 1965 and produces natural gas and condensates. The total proven reserves of the Battonya gas field are around 150 billion cubic feet (4.2×109m³), and production is slated to be around 17.8 million cubic feet/day (0.5×105m³) in 2010.

References

Natural gas fields in Hungary